The 46th FIE Fencing World Cup began in October 2016 and concluded in July 2017 at the 2017 World Fencing Championships held in Leipzig.

Individual épée

Top 8

Individual foil

Top 8

Individual sabre

Top 8

Team épée

Top 8

Team foil

Top 8

Team sabre

Top 8

References

External links
FIE homepage

Fencing World Cup
2016 in fencing
2017 in fencing